Planeshift  may refer to:

Planeshift (Magic: The Gathering), an expansion set for Magic: The Gathering
PlaneShift (video game), a free to play massively multiplayer online role playing game